Okwudili Ndiwe predominantly known as Derico Nwamama was a Nigeria bandit. He terrorised Anambra state from 2000 until he was apprehended by the Bakassi Boys in 2001.

Early life 
Nwamama started off as a pickpocket and street urchin. He transformed into an armed robber during the tenure of governor Chinwoke Mbadinuju at the age of 22.
He started off by robbing market women and banks. He was reported to have killed 25 policemen and at least 100 civilians during his crime span.

Death 
After all trials by the Nigerian police force to nab Nwamama proved abortive, governor Mbadinuju invited the Bakassi Boys to take over. On 3 July 2001, the Bakassi Boys got an intel that Nwamama was coming to Onitsha, they laid an ambush, intercepting him at Nkpor. 6 days later, on 9 July 2001, the Bakassi Boys paraded Nwamama at the Ochanja market before beheading him with a machete.

In popular culture 
A film titled Issakaba, an anagram for the Bakassi Boys, was produced in 2001 by Lancelot Oduwa Imasuen, and it depicted the origin of the vigilante group and their encounter with Nwamama and Anini.

References 

1979 births
2001 deaths
People executed for murder
Bank robbers
Nigerian gangsters
Nigerian people convicted of murder
People convicted of murder by Nigeria
20th-century executions by Nigeria
Executed Nigerian people
Executed gangsters